Arna is a former municipality in the old Hordaland county, Norway. The municipality existed from 1964 until 1972. It encompassed the northeastern part of the Bergen Peninsula, along the Sørfjorden, bordering the city of Bergen across the mountains to the west. The administrative centre of the municipality was the village of Indre Arna. Today, the area of the former municipality makes up the borough of Arna in the city of Bergen.

History
On 1 January 1964, the historic municipality of Haus was split into two parts.  The part on the island of Osterøy became part of the new municipality of Osterøy. The rest of Haus, located on the Bergen Peninsula became the municipality of Arna.  The municipality was short-lived due to its proximity to the growing city of Bergen. On 1 January 1972, Arna was merged into the city of Bergen (along with the other neighboring municipalities of Fana, Laksevåg, and Åsane).  Upon its dissolution in 1972, Arna had 11,766 residents.

The municipality had two different mayors while it was in existence. From 1964 to 1967 Gustav Holtan was mayor and from 1967 to 1971 Arne Ekeland was mayor.

Municipal council
The municipal council  of Arna was made up of 37 representatives that were elected to four year terms.  The party breakdown of the final municipal council was as follows:

See also
List of former municipalities of Norway

References

History of Bergen
Former municipalities of Norway
1964 establishments in Norway
1972 disestablishments in Norway
Populated places disestablished in 1972
Geography of Bergen